was a feudal domain under the Tokugawa shogunate of Edo period Japan, located in Kōzuke Province (modern-day Gunma Prefecture), Japan. It was centered on Yoshii jin'ya in what is now part of the city of Takasaki, Gunma. Yoshii was ruled through much of its history by a branch of the Takatsukasa clan, which had adopted the patronym of Matsudaira.

History
After Tokugawa Ieyasu took control over the Kantō region in 1590, he assigned one of his generals, Sugawara Sadatoshi, the 20,000 koku holding of Yoshii. Sadatoshi laid out the foundations of a town and market, and was succeeded by his adopted son, Okudaira Tadamasa in 1602. Tadamasa’s mother was the eldest daughter of Tokugawa Ieyasu; he was transferred to Kanō Domain in 1610. The domain then became vacant and was ruled as a hatamoto holding until 1682.

In 1682, Hotta Masayasu, a hatamoto bureaucrat in the Tokugawa shogunate, passed the 10,000 koku mark and was raised in status to daimyō. Yoshii Domain was revived to be his seat, but he was transferred to Omi-Miyagawa domain, where his descendants resided to the Meiji restoration, and Yoshii again reverted to tenryō status.

Likewise, in 1709, the hatamoto Matsudaira Nobukiyo attained the 10,000 koku mark, and Yoshii Domain was revived as his seat. Nobukiyo was the grandson of the kuge Takatsukasa Nobuhira, whose sister married Shōgun Tokugawa Iemitsu. He traveled to Edo with only one retainer, but was awarded estates and servants and eventually married a daughter of Tokugawa Yorinobu and adopted the Matsudaira name. The descendants of Matsudaira Nobukiyo continued to rule Yoshii until the end of the Edo period.

During the Bakumatsu period, the final daimyō, Matsudaira Nobunori, changed his name to Yoshii Nobunori, and joined the new Meiji government in February 1868. With the abolition of the han system in July 1871, Yoshii Domain became part of “Iwahana Prefecture”, which later became part of Gunma Prefecture.

Holdings at the end of the Edo period
As with most domains in the han system, Yoshii Domain consisted of several discontinuous territories calculated to provide the assigned kokudaka, based on periodic cadastral surveys and projected agricultural yields. 

Kōzuke Province
1 village in Kanra District
6 villages in Tago District
10 villages in Midono District
1 village in Nawa District
7 villages in Gunma District
1 village in Seta District
Kazusa Province
3 villages in Isumi District
3 villages in Nagara District

List of daimyō

References

External links
 Yoshii on "Edo 300 HTML"

Notes

Domains of Japan
1590 establishments in Japan
States and territories established in 1590
1871 disestablishments in Japan
States and territories disestablished in 1871
Kōzuke Province
History of Gunma Prefecture
Hotta clan
Kishūrenshi-Matsudaira clan
Takatsukasa family